Edward David Crippa (April 8, 1899October 20, 1960) was an American politician who served as a U.S. Senator from Wyoming.

Crippa was born in Rock Springs, Sweetwater County, Wyoming to an Austrian-born mother and an Italian-born father. He was educated in the public schools of Rock Springs, and during World War I Crippa served as a private in the United States Army.

He served on the Rock Springs city council from 1926 to 1928. He was president of Union Mercantile Company in 1930; owner and manager of Crippa Motor Company in Rock Springs; president of North Side State Bank and director of Rock Springs Fuel Company in 1940; and Wyoming State highway commissioner from 1941 to 1947.  In addition, Crippa represented Wyoming on the Republican National Committee.

Crippa was appointed on June 24, 1954, as a Republican to the United States Senate to fill the vacancy caused by the death of Lester C. Hunt and served until November 28, 1954. He was not a candidate for election to fill the vacancy and resumed business activities. Crippa died in Rock Springs in 1960 and was interred in St. Joseph's Cemetery.

References

External links
 Retrieved on 2008-03-19

 The Edward D. Crippa papers at the American Heritage Center

1899 births
1960 deaths
United States Army soldiers
Republican Party United States senators from Wyoming
Wyoming Republicans
People from Rock Springs, Wyoming
Military personnel from Wyoming
Wyoming city council members
United States Army personnel of World War I
American people of Austrian descent
American people of Italian descent
20th-century American politicians